Jacob Gill Gaudaur, Jr.,  (October 5, 1920 – December 4, 2007) was a Canadian Football League (CFL) player, executive, and commissioner. His 45-year career in Canadian football, including 16 years as the league's fourth commissioner (and its longest-serving commissioner), oversaw the start of the modern era of professional Canadian football. As an amateur artist, Gauduar made two important contributions, designing both the Hamilton Tiger-Cats "Leaping Tiger" logo, as well as an early version of the CFL logo.

Early life
Jake Gaudaur, Jr. was born in Orillia, Ontario on October 5, 1920, and was an all-around athlete at Orillia Collegiate Institute. Like his father, Jake Gaudaur Snr., he was a national rowing champion as well as an excellent lacrosse player.

Gaudaur was based at Uplands Air Force Base and served as a RCAF pilot during the Second World War spending the war training more pilots.

Football career
In 1940, aged 19, he began playing football and joined the Hamilton Tigers. The following year he played for the Toronto Argonauts. Gaudaur served as a pilot in the Second World War and won the 30th Grey Cup with the Toronto RCAF Hurricanes in the 1942 season.

Following the war, Gaudaur played for, and was part owner of, the Toronto Indians of the Ontario Rugby Football Union (1945–1946) and then played for the Montreal Alouettes during the 1947 season.

Gaudaur returned to Hamilton to stay in 1948. When the Tigers merged with the Hamilton Flying Wildcats in 1950, Gaudaur became team captain of the resulting Hamilton Tiger-Cats and played through the 1951 season. In 1952, he left the playing field to become director of the team but returned to play a final year in the 1953 season winning the Tiger-Cats first Grey Cup, playing centre.

From 1954, Gaudaur was President of the Tiger-Cats and was President & General Manager from the 1956 season to 1967.  The Ti-Cats appeared in 9 Grey Cups over his term as general manager and won in 1957, 1963, 1965, and 1967.

CFL Commissioner
Jake was the 4th Commissioner of the CFL serving from 1968 through 1984.
During Jake's first year as Commissioner, CFL adopted a new Constitution. In 1980, Jake negotiated and signed on behalf of CFL a record television contract with Carling-O'Keefe Breweries for $15.6 million which covered a 3-year period (1981–83). By 1983, CFL signed a record television agreement with Carling-O'Keefe Breweries for $33 million over a 3-year period (1984-1986). When met with a crisis when Nelson Skalbania briefly acquired the Montreal Alouettes, Gaudaur arranged for the league to seize the franchise, rebrand it as the Montreal Concordes, and sell the franchise to a new owner, Charles Bronfman. This, along with the continued television sponsorship, kept the Montreal franchise alive for another five seasons.

"During his 16-year tenure as commissioner, Gaudaur did wonders for the league. By 1983, new television contracts had increased revenue six-fold, while game attendance had nearly doubled. Gaudaur was also instrumental in establishing a Player Pension Plan and aided greatly in the founding of the Canadian Football Hall of Fame and Museum. Above all, he kept the CFL strictly Canadian. Gaudaur was appointed Governor to Canada's Sports Hall of Fame in 1981 and took on the duties of chairman of the board in 1984. His fundraising efforts resulted in a $1.25 million renovation programme for the Hall to make it one of the most advanced institutions of its kind at the time."

In his last season as CFL commissioner, in 1983, Jake took a personal interest developing a close bond between the CFL and The War Amps kicking off a special tradition – the annual CFL PLAYSAFE Award, saluting the League's support of the PLAYSAFE Program which continues today.

Honours
 He was inducted as a builder into the Toronto Argonauts Hall of Fame in 1984.
 He was inducted into the Canadian Football Hall of Fame as a Builder in 1984.
 In 1985, he was made an Officer of the Order of Canada.
 He was inducted into Canada's Sports Hall of Fame (1990).
 The Jake Gaudaur Veterans' Trophy, presented annually to the CFL player "who best demonstrates the attributes of Canada's veterans in times of war, peace and military conflict", was awarded for the first time in 2010.
 In 2012 represented by Jake's eldest daughter Jackie, Jake was inducted into the Hamilton Sports Hall of Fame.

Personal life
Jake had three daughters.

He died in Burlington, Ontario at the age of 87 in 2007 following a long battle with prostate cancer.

References

1920 births
2007 deaths
Canadian Football Hall of Fame inductees
Canadian Football League commissioners
Deaths from cancer in Ontario
Deaths from prostate cancer
Hamilton Tiger-Cats general managers
Hamilton Tiger-Cats players
Hamilton Tiger-Cats team presidents
Hamilton Tigers football players
Montreal Alouettes players
Officers of the Order of Canada
Ontario Rugby Football Union players
People from Orillia
Players of Canadian football from Ontario
Toronto Argonauts players
Royal Canadian Air Force personnel of World War II
Canadian World War II pilots